Phyllonorycter caraganella is a moth of the family Gracillariidae. It is known from the Russian Far East.

The larvae feed on Caragana fruticosa. They mine the leaves of their host plant.

References

caraganella
Moths of Asia
Moths described in 1986